The 2022–23 Long Beach State Beach men's basketball team represented California State University, Long Beach in the 2022–23 NCAA Division I men's basketball season. The Beach were led by 16th-year head coach Dan Monson and played their home games at the Walter Pyramid as members of the Big West Conference.

Previous season
The Beach finished the 2021–22 season 20–12, 12–3 in Big West play to win the regular season championship, the school's first since 2013 and fourth overall under Monson. They defeated Cal State Bakersfield and UC Santa Barbara to advance to the championship game of the Big West tournament where they lost to Cal State Fullerton. As a regular season champion that did not win its conference tournament, they received an automatic bid to the National Invitation Tournament, losing in the first round at BYU.

Roster

Schedule and results

|-
!colspan=12 style=""| Exhibition

|-
!colspan=12 style=""| Non-conference regular season

|-
!colspan=12 style=""| Big West regular season

|-
!colspan=12 style=""| Big West tournament

Source:

References

Long Beach State
Long Beach State Beach men's basketball seasons
Long Beach State
Long Beach State